Michael Henry John Allen (7 January 1933 – 6 October 1995) was an English cricketer who played for Northamptonshire from 1956 to 1963 and Derbyshire from 1964 to 1966.

Allen was born in Bedford and attended Bedford School.  A right-handed batsman and a left-arm slow bowler, he started his cricket career at Northamptonshire, who finished in fourth position in the County Championship in his debut season, 1956. Allen debuted against Worcestershire in May and played in more than half the matches in the season. In 1957, Allen moved into a regular first-team place and finished high in the bowling averages, as Northamptonshire finished second in the County Championship table.

During the early part of 1958, Allen played two matches for Marylebone Cricket Club. He played for Northamptonshire throughout the 1958 County Championship season, where, once again, the team played strongly, finishing in fourth position in the table. In 1959, with the emergence of the leg-spin bowler Peter Watts, he played less often in the first team.

The retirement of the spin bowlers George Tribe at the end of the 1959 season and Jack Manning in 1960 gave Allen more opportunities and he played consistently for Northamptonshire until the end of the 1963 season. Northamptonshire finished seventh in the 1963 County Championship table, an improvement on their second-bottom table showing the previous season.

Allen moved to Derbyshire for the opening of the 1964 season, debuting against Glamorgan in a rain-affected match. Wisden credited Allen as a factor in Derbyshire's improvement that season from 17th and last to 12th place in the Championship. He represented Derbyshire for two more years, before quitting first-class cricket.

Allen was a consistent bowler, accruing five-wicket bowling hauls in eight individual seasons, and securing ten wickets in an individual match three times. He was a lower-order batsman during his Northamptonshire career, switching to the tailend on occasion while playing for Derbyshire.

Allen died at Lancaster on 6 October 1995 aged 62.

References

 
 

1933 births
1995 deaths
English cricketers
Northamptonshire cricketers
Marylebone Cricket Club cricketers
Derbyshire cricketers
Bedfordshire cricketers
Players cricketers
People educated at Bedford School
North v South cricketers
T. N. Pearce's XI cricketers